Salute to America may refer to:

 2019 Salute to America, an event in Washington, D.C.
 2020 Salute to America, an event in Washington, D.C.
 Salute 2 America Parade, an annual event in Atlanta, Georgia 1961–2007